Aliaksandr Linnik (born 28 January 1991) is a Belarusian sprinter who specialises in the 100 and 200 metres, as well as 110 metres hurdles.

At the 2009 European Athletics Junior Championships in Novi Sad, Serbia, he won a bronze medal over 110 m hurdles, establishing a new Belarusian record with 13.41 seconds in the semis.

Personal best

References

External links

1991 births
Living people
Belarusian male sprinters
Belarusian male hurdlers
World Athletics Championships athletes for Belarus